Harold Dexter (7 October 1920 - 27 June 2000) was a British organist, Professor at the Guildhall School of Music and Drama (Head of General Musicianship Department, 1962–85).  He was educated at Wyggeston Grammar School for Boys, Leicester and Corpus Christi College, Cambridge.

Appointments
1946 -1949 Organist of St. James’ Church, Louth St James' Church, Louth
1949 - 1956 Organist of Holy Trinity Church, Leamington Spa
1956 - 1968 Organist of Southwark Cathedral

References 

 ‘DEXTER, Harold’, Who Was Who, A & C Black, 1920–2008; online edn, Oxford University Press, Dec 2007 accessed 30 July 2011
 http://www.organ-biography.info/index.php?id=Dexter_Harold_1920

1920 births
2000 deaths
People educated at Wyggeston Grammar School for Boys